The 1995 Speedway Grand Prix of Great Britain was the six and last race of the 1995 Speedway Grand Prix season. It took place on 30 September in the Hackney Wick Stadium in London, England.

Starting positions draw
The Speedway Grand Prix Commission nominated Jason Crump as Wild Card.

Heat details

Final classification

See also
 Speedway Grand Prix
 List of Speedway Grand Prix riders

References

External links
FIM-live.com
SpeedwayWorld.tv

Speedway Grand Prix of Great Britain
Gr
1995
Speedway Grand Prix of Great Britain
Speedway Grand Prix of Great Britain